Facundo Ezequiel Silvera Andreoli (born 18 November 2001) is a Uruguayan professional footballer who plays as a midfielder for Danubio.

Career
Silvera is a youth academy graduate of Danubio. He made his professional debut for the club on 5 October 2019 in a 1–1 draw against River Plate Montevideo.

Silvera is a Uruguayan youth international. He is currently a member of Uruguay under-20 team.

Career statistics

References

External links
 

2001 births
Living people
Association football midfielders
Uruguayan footballers
Uruguayan Primera División players
Uruguayan Segunda División players
Danubio F.C. players